Josh Gordon is the name of:

Josh Gordon (born 1991) American football player
Josh Gordon (director), American film director
Josh Gordon (footballer) (born 1994), English footballer for Barrow